Yeshaq I, throne name: Gabra Masqal II (Ge'ez: ገብረ መስቀል) was Emperor of Ethiopia from 1414 to 1429/1430, and a member of the Solomonic dynasty. He was the second son of Emperor Dawit I.

Ancestry
Of Amhara lineage. Yeshaq I was a son of Emperor Dawit I, probably by Seyon Mogasa, one of Dawit's wives.
 
Yeshaq had several notable brothers  among them Emperor Tewodros I who he succeeded in 1414. His younger brothers included Emperor Takla Maryam and Emperor Zara Yaqob.

Sources
Much of the details of Yeshaq's reign is found in the works of the medieval Arab historian Al-Maqrizi as well as in scattered Geez sources, and in an early Amharic poetic text. The overall image of Yeshaq which emerges from the sources is one of a powerful and confrontational leader who fought his enemies, both political and religious, on several fronts.

Reign
Yeshaq's reign was marked by a revolt of the Beta Israel. He also had the church Debre Yeshaq built there to commemorate his victory. Yeshaq also invaded the Shanqella region beyond Agawmeder, and to the southeast he fought against the sons of Sa'ad ad-Din II who returned from exile in the Arabian Peninsula, with him and his father Dawit I both credited for the destruction of Ifat.

Yeshaq, according to the Islamic historian al-Maqrizi, hired a group of Mamluks led by al-Tabingha to train his army in gunnery and swordfighting. This is the earliest reference to firearms (Arabic naft) in Ethiopia. About the same time another Egyptian visitor, a Copt, "reorganized the kingdom," according to al-Maqrizi, "and collected so much wealth for the Hati [the Emperor] that he enjoyed the king's authority." This unnamed Copt also introduced the practice of the Emperor dressing in "splendid" clothes and carrying a cross, which made him stand out from his subjects.

Further, George Wynn Brereton Huntingford suggests that it was during Yeshaq's reign that the rulers of Ethiopia ceased having permanent capitals; instead, their courts were held in their encampments as they progressed around their realm.

Yeshaq made the earliest known contact from post-Axumite Ethiopia to a European ruler. He sent a letter by two dignitaries to Alfonso V of Aragon, which reached the king in 1428, proposing an alliance against the Muslims and would be sealed by a dual marriage, that would require Infante Peter to bring a group of artisans to Ethiopia, where he would marry Yeshaq's daughter. It is not clear how or if Alfonso responded to this letter, although in a letter that reached Yeshaq's successor Zara Yaqob in 1450, Alfonso wrote that he would be happy to send artisans to Ethiopia if their safe arrival could be guaranteed, for on a previous occasion a party of thirteen of his subjects traveling to Ethiopia had all perished.

A notable example of Ethiopian literature that has survived from this period is a panegyric addressed to Yeshaq, which Enrico Cerulli singled out as a gem of Ethiopian poetry. The first mention of the Yem people is found (under the now pejorative exonym "Jangero") in the victory song of Yishaq I, with them stated as paying tribute in the form of horses to the king. The first mention of the ethnonym "Somali" dates to the reign of Emperor Yishaq who had one of his court officials compose a hymn celebrating a military victory over the Sultan of Ifat's eponymous troops.

E. A. Wallis Budge states that he was assassinated, and "buried in Tadbaba Maryam", a convent in Sayint, while Ethiopian historian Tadesse Tamrat believes that the primary sources mask Yeshaq's death in battle against the Muslims or Adalites.

References

1429 deaths
15th-century monarchs in Africa
15th-century emperors of Ethiopia
15th-century murdered monarchs
Solomonic dynasty
Year of birth unknown
People murdered in Ethiopia